The MacGregor 26 is an American trailerable sailboat, that was designed by Roger MacGregor and first built in 1986, with production ending in 2013.

The boat was built by MacGregor Yacht Corporation in the United States.

The design was developed into the Tattoo 26, which remains in production by Tattoo Yachts.

Design
The MacGregor 26 is a small recreational sailboat, built predominantly of fiberglass, with models designed for sailing and motor-sailing. It has a fractional sloop rig, a transom-hung rudder and a centerboard or daggerboard keel, depending on the model, with flooding water ballast. The ballast is drained for road transport.

Variants
MacGregor 26D
Daggerboard-equipped model introduced in 1986 and produced until 1989. The boat has a PHRF racing average handicap of 222 with a high of 258 and low of 198. It was replaced in production by the centerboard-equipped MacGregor 26S in 1990.
MacGregor 26S
Centerboard-equipped model introduced in 1990 and produced until 1995. It was replaced in production by the dual-rudder MacGregor 26X in 1995.
MacGregor 26X
Centerboard-equipped, dual-rudder, motor-sailing model introduced in 1995 and produced until 2003, with 5000 produced. It was replaced in production by the dual-rudder MacGregor 26M in 2003.

MacGregor 26M
Daggerboard-equipped, dual-rudder, rotating spar, motor-sailing model introduced in 2002 and produced until 2013. It is capable of  under power, with no water ballast.

See also
List of sailing boat types

Related development
MacGregor 25

Similar sailboats
Beneteau First 26
Dawson 26
Gougeon 32
Hunter 19-2
Hunter 23.5
Hunter 240
Hunter 260
Hunter 27 Edge
Parker Dawson 26

References

External links

1980s sailboat type designs
Sailing yachts
Trailer sailers
Sailboat type designs by Roger MacGregor
Sailboat types built by the MacGregor Yacht Corporation